Debbie McWhinnie (born 31 January 1981) is a former Scottish international football striker. She last played in the Scottish Women's Premier League for Hibernian Ladies, having previously represented Spartans and Glasgow City.

Club career
In February 2004 McWhinnie scored a record 12 goals in Glasgow City's 28–0 Scottish Women's Cup win over third division Motherwell. City manager Peter Caulfield called McWhinnie "the best striker playing in Scotland, with national No.1 Julie Fleeting at Arsenal." After scoring 72 goals in 36 appearances for Glasgow City, McWhinnie signed for Champions Hibernian in summer 2004. She scored 10 goals in Hibs' 17–0 win over East Kilbride in August 2004.

International career
In January 1997 15–year–old McWhinnie was part of a youthful Scotland national team who toured Brazil; suffering 5–0, 6–0 and 7–1 defeats to their hosts. She was reportedly offered a professional contract to play club football in Brazil.

McWhinnie and Julie Fleeting scored Scotland's goals in an 8–2 friendly defeat to United States before 6,295 fans in Columbus, Ohio on 8 September 2002.

References

External links
 

1981 births
Living people
Scottish women's footballers
Scotland women's international footballers
Hibernian W.F.C. players
Glasgow City F.C. players
Women's association football forwards
Spartans W.F.C. players